Musacchio v. United States, 577 U.S. ___ (2016), was a case in which the Supreme Court of the United States clarified procedures for appellate review when the government does not object to an erroneous jury instruction that adds elements to a criminal offense as well as whether a defendant may raise a statute of limitations defense for the first time on appeal. In a unanimous opinion written by Justice Clarence Thomas, the Court held that when reviewing a claim that the government failed to demonstrate sufficient evidence to substantiate a criminal offense, an appellate court should assess the elements of the alleged crime, rather than the elements that were described in jury instructions. Justice Thomas explained that "[a] reviewing court’s limited determination on sufficiency review ... does not rest on how the jury was instructed." Additionally, with respect to the statute of limitations issue, Justice Thomas held that a statute of limitations defense cannot be raised for the first time on appeal.

See also
 List of United States Supreme Court cases
 Lists of United States Supreme Court cases by volume
 List of United States Supreme Court cases by the Roberts Court

References

External links
 

United States Supreme Court cases
United States Supreme Court cases of the Roberts Court
2016 in United States case law
Statutes of limitations